Turhan Baytop  (June 20, 1920 – June 25, 2002) was a Turkish botanist and pharmacist from Istanbul.

He was born on June 20, 1920, at Üsküdar, Istanbul. His father was a military officer and a keen amateur botanist.

He then started studying at the 'University College of Pharmacy' in Istanbul in 1945 he graduated. He later served as a pharmacist in the medical corps during his military service. In 1948, Baytop returned to the college and gained his doctorate with a chemical investigation of Ephedra, the group of plants that contain important drugs such as ephedrine. This was followed by a similar study of a Turkish species of liquorice, Glycyrrhiza glabra.

He started working as an assistant at the Institute of Pharmacognosy of the school. With a thesis prepared in 1949 by Dr. pharm. Turhan Baytop winning the title, he went in 1951 to Paris to study pharmacology. In 1952, he returned to Turkey, the associate Baytop next year, ten years later, in 1963 received the title of professor. Istanbul University was the first dean of the Faculty of Pharmacy. Five-time dean did in different periods, 1969 - Between 1987 Pharmacognosy moment found at department chairman. Who retired in 1987. Prof. Turhan Baytop Turkey's medicinal plants, flora of Turkey and the Turkish pharmaceutical research and did study history. Books and over 300 published research. Istanbul University Faculty of Pharmacy of the "History of Pharmacy Museum," which established the Professor Baytop, many historical items in 1990 conferred this museum began regulation of the Turkish History of Pharmacy Meeting between 1984 -1996 in "Pharmacy History and Ethics" course, giving wrote a textbook. Botanical Turhan also interested in the science Baytop studied the tulips and roses of the past, this He wrote a book about it in English and translated into Japanese.

He was married to fellow botanist Asuman Baytop.

Notable publications
Türkiyenin Tibbi ve Zehirli Bitkileri, 1963
Türkiye'de Bitkiler ile Tedavi, 1984, 
The Bulbous Plants of Turkey, 1984 (B.Mathew ile birlikte) 
Türk Eczacılık Tarihi, 1985 
İstanbul Lalesi, 1992 
Türkçe Bitki Adları Sözlüğü, 1994  
Eczahane'den Eczane'ye, 1995 
Laboratuvar'dan Fabrika'ya, 1997 
İstanbul Florası Araştırmaları, 2002, 
Türk Eczacılık Tarihi Araştırmaları, Anadolu Dağlarında 50 Yıl, 2000  
Türkiye'de Eski Bahçe Gülleri, 2001 
İstanbul Florası Araştırmaları, 2002
Türkiye'de Eski Bahçe Gülleri, 2001

References

External links
Prof. Turhan Baytop 
International Plant Names ref

Turkish non-fiction writers
Turkish pharmacologists
Turkish botanists
1920 births
2002 deaths
Academic staff of Istanbul University
Istanbul University alumni
Burials at Zincirlikuyu Cemetery
Recipients of TÜBİTAK Science Award
Turkish expatriates in France